Hautes-Pyrénées (Gascon/Occitan: Nauts Pirenèus / Hauts Pirenèus ['awts piɾeˈnɛʊs]; ;  ['alts piɾiˈneʊs]; English: Upper Pyrenees) is a department in the region of Occitania, southwestern France. In 2019, its population was 229,567; its prefecture is Tarbes. It is named after the Pyrenees mountain range.

History
Historically the area broadly covered by the département known as Bigorre, a territory at times independent but later part of Gascony province. Large parts of the area were held by the English after the Treaty of Brétigny, 1360. In the 16th century, it was part of the Huguenot domain of the monarchs of Navarre, brought to France by Henri IV. For its early history, see Bigorre and Gascony.

The département of Hautes-Pyrénées was created at the time of the French Revolution, on 4 March 1790, through the influence of French politician Bertrand Barère, a member of the Convention.

Geography

Hautes-Pyrénées consists of several distinct geographical areas. The southern portion, along the border with Spain, consists of mountains such as the Vignemale, the Pic du Midi de Bigorre, and the Neouvielle and Arbizon ranges. A second area consists of low-altitude rolling hills. The Northern part of the département consists of largely flat agricultural land. Hautes-Pyrénées has two small territorial exclaves—a remnant from the Middle Ages—located within the neighboring département of Pyrénées-Atlantiques.

Principal towns

The greater Tarbes area is the economic and administrative focus of the département, while Lourdes, the second-biggest city in Hautes-Pyrénées, is dedicated almost exclusively to the religious pilgrimage industry. As of 2019, there are 7 communes with more than 5,000 inhabitants:

Demographics 
Population development since 1801:

Politics

The president of the Departmental Council is Michel Pélieu, first elected in 2011.

Current National Assembly Representatives

Tourism 
The Western Pyrenees National Park covers a significant area, and includes well-known attractions such as the Cirque de Gavarnie and the Pont d'Espagne. The entire area is a favorite destination of hikers and mountain enthusiasts.

The area has been known perhaps since Antiquity for its hot springs, and several towns were built around these, most notably Cauterets, Luz-Saint-Sauveur and Bagnères-de-Bigorre.

A notable lake in the area is Lac Bleu d'Ilhéou, southwest of Cauterets.

There are a number of popular ski resorts in Hautes-Pyrénées such as Barèges-La Mongie, Gavarnie, Luz-Ardiden, Cauterets, Hautacam, Piau-Engaly and Saint-Lary-Soulan.

The area is a nearly-permanent fixture on the Tour de France's itinerary, with significantly difficult passes such as the Tourmalet, the Aubisque and the Soulor.

The region's premier avant-garde jazz festival is held each year in Luz-Saint-Sauveur: Jazz a Luz. Tarbes hosts an annual horse festival, Equestria, and a Tango festival, Tarbes en Tango.

See also
Cantons of the Hautes-Pyrénées department
Communes of the Hautes-Pyrénées department
Arrondissements of the Hautes-Pyrénées department

References

External links
  Departmental Council of Hautes-Pyrénées website
  Prefecture website
 Pyrenees National Park
  Photography Panoramics 360° website

 
1790 establishments in France
Departments of Occitania (administrative region)
States and territories established in 1790